Balloon cell nevus is a benign nevus. It appears like a melanocytic nevus. 

Histologically it is characterized by swollen, pale, polyhedral melanocytes, with pale cytoplasm and a central nucleus. It is different to balloon cell melanoma, which has larger nuclei and is structured like a melanoma.

It was first described by Judalaewitsch in 1901.

See also 
 Pseudomelanoma
 Skin lesion

References

External links 

Melanocytic nevi and neoplasms